Sun Over Klara (Swedish:Sol över Klara) is a 1942 Swedish drama film directed by Emil A. Lingheim and starring Edvard Persson, Barbro Flodquist and Stina Ståhle.

The film's art direction was by Max Linder.

Main cast
 Edvard Persson as Ararat  
 Barbro Flodquist as Sylvia  
 Stina Ståhle as Elisabeth Söderheim  
 Björn Berglund as Axel  
 Bror Bügler as Reuben  
 Frithiof Hedvall as Tirolius  
 Nils Ekstam 
 Martin Sterner as man with silvery hair  
 Tord Bernheim as Manne  
 Anders Julius as himself  
 Karl 'Lax-Kalle' Andersson as Lax-Kalle  
 Gerd Mårtensson as Sonja  
 Viveka Linder as Britta  
 Åke Claesson as Carl Michael Bellman  
 Bullan Weijden as Hulda  
 Arthur Fischer as Porter 
 Arne Lindblad as Magician  
 Harald Svensson as Colonel Karlsson  
 Hartwig Fock as Tax Collector  
 Artur Cederborgh as Sergeant  
 Carl Deurell as Priest

References

Bibliography 
 Qvist, Per Olov & von Bagh, Peter. Guide to the Cinema of Sweden and Finland. Greenwood Publishing Group, 2000.

External links 
 

1942 films
1942 drama films
Swedish drama films
1940s Swedish-language films
Films directed by Emil A. Lingheim
Swedish black-and-white films
1940s Swedish films